Alexandra Mendès  (born November 3, 1963) is a Canadian Liberal politician, currently serving as the Member of Parliament for the riding of Brossard—Saint-Lambert since 2015. She previously served in the House of Commons from 2008 until 2011 as the MP for the riding of Brossard—La Prairie.

Biography

Mendès worked as a constituency assistant to Jacques Saada, who served as a Liberal MP for Brossard—La Prairie from 1997 to 2006. She also taught at the Brossard Portuguese School. Mendès was a Quebec assistant to Bob Rae for a period of eight months during his leadership campaign. She has worked for fifteen years at a settlement organization for new immigrants and refugees at Maison Internationale de la Rive-Sud.

She was elected to the House of Commons in 2008, defeating Bloc Quebecois MP Marcel Lussier, who had defeated her former boss Saada in the previous election. She initially came in second by 102 votes, but a recount ordered by Elections Canada resulted in her winning by a margin of 69 votes. She was defeated in the 2011 election by NDP candidate Hoang Mai.

In August 2011, Mendès announced her candidacy for the presidency of the Liberal Party of Canada. She was defeated in her race for the presidency by Mike Crawley, but remained a committed member of the party, making appearances on CTV and CBC's Power and Politics representing the party. In June 2012, Mendès became President of the Liberal Party's Quebec wing, the Liberal Party of Canada (Quebec).

In the 2015 federal election, Mendès was the Liberal candidate in the newly created riding of Brossard—Saint-Lambert, again facing off against Mai. She defeated Mai, returning to the House of Commons.

On April 6, 2017, Mendès moved a motion "That the House do now proceed to Orders of the Day" during debate on a Question of Privilege of an instance of Members of Parliament having their Rights as Members denied. Such a motion during a debate on a Question of Privilege had never been made before in Canadian Parliamentary History. The Liberal majority voted in favour of Mendès's motion, preventing the issue from being reviewed by the Canadian House of Commons Standing Committee on Procedure and House Affairs.

On April 11, 2017, the Speaker of the House of Commons Geoff Regan said the motion was unprecedented and ruled that the Question of Privilege should be revived.

As a child, Mendès was a member of the Girl Guides of Canada and has spoken in the House of Commons about her view that "much of what (she is) today (she) owes to Guiding".

On February 28, 2019, Mendès created controversy when during an emergency debate on the SNC-Lavalin affair she said "I really do not understand why this is a big deal."

Mendès was re-elected in the 2019 Canadian federal election.

On December 10, 2019, Mendès was appointed Assistant Deputy Speaker and Assistant Deputy Chair of Committees of the Whole

Electoral record

References

External links 

1963 births
Women members of the House of Commons of Canada
Francophone Quebec people
Liberal Party of Canada MPs
Living people
Members of the House of Commons of Canada from Quebec
People from Brossard
People from Lisbon
Portuguese emigrants to Canada
Women in Quebec politics
21st-century Canadian politicians
21st-century Canadian women politicians